Advanced Engineering Materials is a peer-reviewed materials science journal that publishes monthly. 
Advanced Engineering Materials publishes peer-reviewed reviews, communications, and full papers, on topics centered around structural materials, such as metals, alloys, ceramics, composites, plastics etc..

Abstracting and indexing

Thomson Reuters
Current Contents / Engineering, Computing & Technology
Journal Citation Reports
Materials Science Citation Index
Science Citation Index Expanded

Elsevier
Compendex
SCOPUS

CSA Illumina
Advanced Polymer Abstracts
Ceramic Abstracts
Civil Engineering Abstracts
Computer & Information Systems Abstracts 
Computer Information & Technology Abstracts
Earthquake Engineering Abstracts 
Mechanical & Transportation Engineering Abstracts
Technology Research Database
Engineered Materials Abstracts
International Aerospace Abstracts 
Materials Business File
METADEX

Other databases
Chemical Abstracts Service - SciFinder
PASCAL database
FIZ Karlsruhe
INSPEC
Polymer Library

See also
Advanced Materials

References

Chemistry journals
Materials science journals
English-language journals
Monthly journals
Wiley-Blackwell academic journals